General Sir Michael John Wilkes,  (11 June 1940 – 27 October 2013) was a British army officer who became Adjutant-General to the Forces in the United Kingdom.

Early life
The son of an Artillery officer, Michael John Wilkes was born at Steep, Hampshire, on 11 June 1940 and educated at King's School, Rochester where he played rugby for the 1st XV.

Military career
Wilkes was commissioned in to the Royal Artillery in 1961. In 1977 he took command of 22 SAS Regiment at the age of 36. The regiment had been given a new role in counter-terrorism. The training instituted involved hostage situations, negotiations with those making demands, and assaults when it was judged that talks had broken down. 
Under Wilkes's leadership, the regiment became adept at responding rapidly to the different tactics employed by terrorists. He also set up a robust liaison system linking the SAS commander to the police, the security services and the Cabinet Office Briefing Rooms (Cobra). In an increasingly turbulent world, other countries began to request help from Britain in developing their own specialised units to counter terrorism and to provide VIP protection. Then, in October 1977, a Lufthansa Boeing 737 on its way from Majorca to Frankfurt with some 90 passengers and crew was hijacked by terrorists armed with guns and explosives. The Germans asked the SAS for help and Wilkes dispatched a small team to offer advice to GSG 9, their anti-terrorist squad. The aircraft was stormed successfully at Mogadishu, Somalia, and the hostages freed. The operation gave added impetus to the expansion of training and organisation for anti-terrorist tasks by the regiment. Wilkes moved on in 1979, but the decisive intervention by the SAS in the Iranian Embassy siege in May the following year by Michael Rose (British Army officer) was convincing evidence of the value of his legacy. He served as Commanding Officer of 22 SAS

Wilkes was appointed Commander of 22 Armoured Brigade in 1984 and Director SAS in 1986. He was appointed General Officer Commanding 3rd Armoured Division in 1988 and Commander UK Field Army and Inspector General of the Territorial Army in 1990, remaining in that post until 1993. During Operation Granby he was the Land Deputy to the Joint Commander Gulf Forces who was based at HQ Strike Command. In 1993 he became Adjutant General: he retired from the British Army in 1995.

Later life
In 1995 he became Lieutenant Governor of Jersey, a post he held until 2001. In 2008 he became a Director of Heritage Oil and of Stanley Gibbons. He died on 27 October 2013, leaving a wife (Anne) and two sons.

Honours
Wilkes was appointed Officer of the Order of the British Empire (OBE) in the 1980 New Year Honours, and was promoted to Commander of the Order of the British Empire (CBE) in the 1988 Queen's Birthday Honours. He was appointed Knight Commander of the Order of the Bath (KCB) in the 1991 New Year Honours. In 1995 he was named a Knight of the Venerable Order of Saint John (KStJ).

References

|-

|-
 

|-
 

|-

 
|-

|-

1940 births
Governors of Jersey
British Army generals
Special Air Service officers
Graduates of the Royal Military Academy Sandhurst
People educated at King's School, Rochester
Commanders of the Order of the British Empire
Knights Commander of the Order of the Bath
Knights of the Order of St John
Royal Horse Artillery officers
British Army personnel of the Gulf War
2013 deaths
Honourable Artillery Company officers
People from Steep, Hampshire